The Pirate Party of Greece is a political party in Greece.  Based on the model of the Swedish Pirate Party, it supports reform of copyright law, the abolition of patents, and respect for privacy.

The Pirate Party of Greece is a full member of Pirate Parties International.

The party was founded on 14 January 2012. It was officially recognized on 10 February 2012, and had 480 members on that date. At the 8 December 2013 Congress, the principles of Direct Democracy and Ecology were deleted. The proceedings of the 2013 congress have not been published. Today the party has about 20-25 active members.

Elections

May/June Legislative Elections 2012
On 6 May Greek legislative election, 2012 the party managed to present candidates in 31 of the 56 constituencies and secured 0.51% (32,484) of the total votes. Out of 32 parties, the Pirate Party came 19th. In the June 2012 election the party received 0.23% of the vote (14,169), coming 14th out of 21 parties.

European Elections 2014
On 25 May 2014 the party participated in the 2014 European elections in a coalition with Ecologist Greens. The coalition received 0,90% (51.573) of the vote. Noted that Ecologist Greens (standalone with no coalition and before their breakup in two separate parties) received in the May 2012 election 2,93% (185.366) of the vote, and in the June 2012 election 0.88% (54.420) of the vote. Their second half, Prasinoi participated separately in the European elections and received 0.50% (28,460 votes).

European Elections 2019
In May 2019 the party participated in the 2019 European elections in a coalition with Popular Unity. The coalition received 0,56% (31.674) of the vote.

References

External links
 Official website

Greece
Political parties in Greece
Political parties established in 2012
2012 establishments in Greece